Lemuel Shattuck Hospital is a 255-bed public health and teaching hospital in Jamaica Plain (Boston), Massachusetts in the United States. Shattuck provides acute, subacute, and ambulatory care.

Lemuel Shattuck, for whom the institution is named, was an area bookseller who played a role in creating America's first board of public health.

Services
Shattuck offers outpatient care, surgical services, outpatient clinics, radiological imaging, and laboratory services. The hospital maintains several governmental and academic relationships, such as with the Massachusetts Department of Mental Health, Massachusetts Department of Correction, and Tufts University School of Medicine.

The hospital plans to relocate its services to the Newton Pavilion in Boston's South End in 2024.

References

Hospitals in Boston